Jeroen Paul Trommel (born 1 August 1980) is a former Dutch volleyball player, a member of Netherlands men's national volleyball team, a participant of the 2004 Olympic Games, 2009 Turkish Champion, 2011 German Champion.

Career

Clubs
In season 2013/2014 won CEV Cup with his French team Paris Volley after match with Russian club Guberniya Nizhniy Novgorod. In 2014 moved to Polish club MKS Cuprum Lubin.

He ended up career in 2015.

Sporting achievements

Clubs

CEV Cup

  2013/2014 - with Paris Volley

National championship
 2002/2003  Dutch SuperCup2002, with Omniworld Almere
 2002/2003  Dutch Cup, with Omniworld Almere
 2003/2004  Dutch SuperCup2003, with Omniworld Almere
 2003/2004  Dutch Cup, with Omniworld Almere
 2004/2005  Dutch SuperCup2004, with Omniworld Almere
 2006/2007  French Cup, with AS Cannes VB
 2008/2009  Turkish Championship, with İstanbul Belediyesi
 2010/2011  German Championship, with VfB Friedrichshafen
 2013/2014  French Championship, with Paris Volley

References

External links
 FIVB profile
 PlusLiga player profile

1980 births
Living people
Sportspeople from Apeldoorn
Dutch men's volleyball players
Dutch expatriate sportspeople in France
Expatriate volleyball players in France
Dutch expatriate sportspeople in Turkey
Dutch expatriate sportspeople in Germany
Expatriate volleyball players in Germany
Dutch expatriate sportspeople in Poland
Expatriate volleyball players in Poland
Volleyball players at the 2004 Summer Olympics
Olympic volleyball players of the Netherlands
Cuprum Lubin players
Expatriate volleyball players in Turkey